The Indian Tomb or Das indische Grabmal may refer to:

 Das indische Grabmal (novel), 1918 novel by Thea von Harbou.
 The Indian Tomb 1921 German silent film directed by Joe May, script by Fritz Lang and Thea von Harbou.
 Part 1: The Mission of the Yogi (1921 film).
 Part 2: The Tiger of Bengal (1921 film); German: Das indische Grabmal: Der Tiger von Eschnapur.
 1938 German film directed by Richard Eichberg. 
 Part 1: The Tiger of Eschnapur.
 Part 2: The Indian Tomb.
 1959 German film directed by Fritz Lang. 
 Part 1: The Tiger of Eschnapur.
 Part 2: The Indian Tomb.
 The Indian Tomb, nickname of the Indoor Hall of Apostolos Nikolaidis Stadium (stadium of Panathinaikos)

See also
The Tiger of Eschnapur (disambiguation)